The Yard–Groesbeck House at 157 W 200 S in Springville, Utah was built in 1891.  It was listed on the National Register of Historic Places in 1998.

It was built originally as a one-story "Victorian T-cottage" but was soon expanded to a two-story house.

References

Houses on the National Register of Historic Places in Utah
Victorian architecture in Utah
Houses completed in 1891
Houses in Utah County, Utah
National Register of Historic Places in Utah County, Utah
Buildings and structures in Springville, Utah